Nachaba congrualis is a species of snout moth in the genus Nachaba. It was described by Francis Walker in 1859, and is known from Rio de Janeiro, Brazil.

References

Moths described in 1859
Chrysauginae